The South American Youth Championship 1974 was held in Arica, Concepción and Santiago, Chile.

Teams
The following teams entered the tournament:

 
 
  (host)

Group stage

Group A

Group B

Semifinals

Third place match

Final

External links
Results by RSSSF

South American Youth Championship
International association football competitions hosted by Chile
1974 in South American football
1974 in youth association football
1974 in Chilean football